Astrosniks (also known as Sniks) are fictional characters created in 1975 by the German company Bullyland to market collectible toys, especially plastic figurines. Their design has a retro-futuristic look.

History
Astroniks were released as several sets of figurines in Germany in the 1970s, and were then licensed to about 50 manufacturers to produce memorabilia in 1983 and 1984. One prominent outlet for Astrosnik figurines during this era was McDonald's, which included them in a long-running Happy Meal promotion. The toys were usually offered as consolation prizes on the game show Starcade.

The Snik figurines were reissued in 1999.

Characters
In the plot accompanying the toys, the Sniks originate on a mobile planetoid called Snikeria, which is close in size to Ceres, Pallas, and Vesta (between 469 and 950 km in diameter), and has been hidden from Earth behind Mars for millions of years. When Snikeria became overpopulated, the Sniks moved to Mars, and developed a subterranean system of paths and supply lines.

Sniks are about 5 to 6 cm (2" to 2.5") high, possesses enormous strength and intelligence, and are racially diverse. A subspecies of Astrosniks, Marsmen Sniks (also known as Walkman Sniks), do not have any arms or visible noses.

List of Astrosniks
Airport, Astralia (female), Astro, Baby, Banner, Baseball, Bob, CB, Commander, Copter, Diogene, Drill, Frigo (snowman), Galaxo, Golf, Hockey, Jet, Jockey, Jog, Junior, Kick, Mechanic, Perfido, Potamus (dragon), Pyramido, Quick, Racing, Robo (gold robot), Scout, Ski, Snuk, Space, Starla, Surf, Tennis and more

Books
 Astrosniks - El Heroe Snik 
 Astrosniks - SNIK Contra SNIK 
 Astrosniks - El Circo Snik 
 Astrosniks - El Tesoro Snik 
 Astrosniks in Snikville Coloring Book 
 Astrosniks in Space Coloring Book 
 Astrosniks Stamp Fun 
 Junior's Day in Space: An Astrosnik Adventure by Luke, Melinda 
 Quasar Caper, The: An Astrosnik Adventure by Luke, Melinda 

 Bully Reference Book - pictures and describes all Sniks and their history, as well as all Bully figures made up to 1998.

Cassette
 Die Sniks: Abenteuer auf einem fremden Stern - Ein Hörspiel von Wolf Orloff - Fontana Records #7252 206

References

Toy figurines